The route PR-CV 100 is a short-distance footpath of the Valencian Community (Spain) that goes from Ròtova (Valencia) to the Monastery of Sant Jeroni de Cotalba, in Alfauir (Valencia), crossing different natural places and monuments, saws, rivers, etc., all of them of great landscape and cultural interest.

The official name of the route PR-CV 100 is "Rotova's Paths - The ways of the Marchuquera Saw". The route was promoted by the "Centre Excursioniste de Ròtova" and authorized by the Federation of Mountain's Sports and Climbing of the Valencian Community (FEMECV).

Characteristics 
Distance: 12,400 km.
Time: 5 hours.
Difficulty: Middle.
Maximum altitude: 600 m.
Type: Circular.

Itinerary 
Ròtova
Ghotic aqueduct of the Monastery of Sant Jeroni de Cotalba
Monastery of Sant Jeroni de Cotalba
Fountain Galerías
Horno de cal
Peñal
La Esclusa
El Picayo
Alto del Águila
Fountain Barreño
La Coveta
Ròtova
The route possesses a variant from "Fuente Galerías" (Galerias Fountain) to the Borró castle and since "Fuente de Borró" (Borró Fountain) to Rótova (1 hour).

Places of interest 
Historical centers of Rótova and Alfauir
Monastery of Sant Jeroni de Cotalba
Borró Castle
Palace of the Counts of Ròtova
River Vernisa, aqueducts and construccions of the bank
Alto del Águila
Valley of the Marchuquera and views of La Safor
Falconera and Ador saws

Signposting  
The whole route is marked by both horizontal lines white and yellow, typical of the short-distance footpath.

Recreative facilities 
Refuges:
Refuge Casa dels Garcies (Centre Excursioniste de Ròtova)
Recreative areas:
La Font del Llop (Terrateig)

Information 
Tourist Info Office of Rótova
Tourist Info Office of Gandia

See also 
 Monastery of Sant Jeroni de Cotalba
 Route of the Monasteries of Valencia
 Route of the Borgias
 Route of the Valencian classics
 Ròtova
 Alfauir

References

External links 

PR-CV 100 at FEMECV 
Consejería de Medio Ambiente de la Generalidad Valenciana 
Website of the Monastery of Sant Jeroni de Cotalba 
PR-CV 100: Ways of Ròtova 
Documents of the PR-CV 100 on TopWalk.net 
Map and comments about the route PR-CV 100 

Hiking trails in Spain
Monastery of Sant Jeroni de Cotalba
Tourism in the Valencian Community
Tourist attractions in the Valencian Community
Geography of the Valencian Community
Geography of the Province of Valencia